Kotoni Station is the name of two train stations in Sapporo, Japan:

 Kotoni Station (JR Hokkaido)
 Kotoni Station (Sapporo Municipal Subway)